Sepia bathyalis is a species of cuttlefish native to the southwestern Indian Ocean, specifically northwestern and southwestern Madagascar. It lives at a depth of between 300 and 500 m.

Sepia bathyalis grows to a mantle length of 80 mm.

The type specimen was collected near Madagascar ( to ). It is deposited at the Zoological Museum in Moscow.

References

External links

Cuttlefish
Molluscs described in 1991